Packhorse Peak is a summit in British Columbia, Canada.

Description

Packhorse Peak is a  mountain located in the Clark Range of the Canadian Rockies. The nearest higher neighbor is Tombstone Mountain,  to the southeast. Precipitation runoff from Packhorse Peak drains into tributaries of the Flathead River, which is three kilometers to the west. The mountain's toponym was published in 1917 from surveys performed in 1915, and was officially adopted in 1939 by the Geographical Names Board of Canada.

Geology
Packhorse Peak is composed of sedimentary rock laid down during the Precambrian to Jurassic periods. Formed in shallow seas, this sedimentary rock was pushed east and over the top of younger Cretaceous period rock during the Laramide orogeny.

Climate
Based on the Köppen climate classification, Packhorse Peak is located in a subarctic climate zone with cold, snowy winters, and mild summers. Winter temperatures can drop below −20 °C with wind chill factors below −30 °C.

See also
Geography of British Columbia

References

External links
 Packhorse Peak: weather forecast

Two-thousanders of British Columbia
Canadian Rockies
Kootenay Land District